Eric Aserlind is an American lightweight rower. He won a gold medal at the 1974 World Rowing Championships in Lucerne with the lightweight men's eight.

He is from Madison, Wisconsin. He was inducted into the U.S. Rowing Hall of Fame in 1986.

References

Year of birth missing (living people)
American male rowers
World Rowing Championships medalists for the United States
Possibly living people